The following is a list of the 679 communes of the Oise department of France.

The communes cooperate in the following intercommunalities (as of 2020):
Communauté d'agglomération du Beauvaisis
Communauté d'agglomération de la Région de Compiègne et de la Basse Automne
Communauté d'agglomération Creil Sud Oise
Communauté de communes de l'Aire Cantilienne
Communauté de communes du Clermontois
Communauté de communes des Deux Vallées
Communauté de communes du Liancourtois
Communauté de communes des Lisières de l'Oise
Communauté de communes de l'Oise Picarde
Communauté de communes du Pays de Bray
Communauté de communes du Pays Noyonnais
Communauté de communes des Pays d'Oise et d'Halatte
Communauté de communes du Pays des Sources
Communauté de communes du Pays de Valois
Communauté de communes de la Picardie verte
Communauté de communes de la Plaine d'Estrées
Communauté de communes du Plateau Picard
Communauté de communes des Sablons
Communauté de communes Senlis Sud Oise
Communauté de communes Thelloise
Communauté de communes du Vexin-Thelle

References

Oise